Ganji Bhoyare is a village in Parner taluka in Ahmednagar district of state of Maharashtra, India.

See also
 Parner taluka
 Villages in Parner taluka

References 

Villages in Parner taluka
Villages in Ahmednagar district